The Torch Tower is a proposed supertall skyscraper at the Tokyo Torch redevelopment district in Tokyo, Japan. Scheduled to be completed in 2027, it will be the tallest building in Japan, surpassing the nearby  Azabudai Hills Mori JP Tower.

Location

Building
The Torch Tower will feature 67 floors in total, 63 above ground and four below ground. Floors 7 through 53 will be used for offices, while higher floors will be home to a luxury hotel and an observation deck, where visitors can view the Tokyo Bay and Mount Fuji, Japan's tallest mountain. The lower floors will include a large events hall with seats for up to 2,000 people.

The lobby floor of the hotel is designed to take in fresh air from the outside in a space surrounded by greenery, including trees.

The exterior of the building will have a torch-inspired design. The name, Torch Tower, was chosen in the hope that the tower will "illuminate Japan".

The total floor area will be circa . This is 1.75 times more floor space than the Burj Khalifa's .

Construction will start in October 2023 and is scheduled to be completed in 2027. The project is expected to cost about ¥500 billion ($4.77 billion U.S. dollars).

See also
 Tokyo Torch, the entire district
 Tokiwabashi Tower, the second skyscraper at Tokyo Torch
 List of tallest structures in Japan

References

External links
 Tokyo Torch official website

Proposed skyscrapers in Japan
Skyscrapers in Tokyo
Buildings and structures in Chiyoda, Tokyo